John Gracie is a Canadian folk music artist. Born in Glace Bay, Nova Scotia, Gracie is a three-time East Coast Music Awards Male Artist of the Year, winning in 1989, 1990 and 2000. He has also received nominations from the Juno Awards and the RPM Music Awards, among others. His song "Pass It On" was selected as a theme song for food banks across Canada.

Discography

Albums

Singles

References
3.

External links
Official Site

Canadian country singers
Canadian folk singers
Canadian male singers
Living people
Year of birth missing (living people)